Pseudohaje is a genus of venomous African elapid snakes, commonly called tree cobras or forest cobras because of their arboreal lifestyle.  Their ability to produce a hood is limited to a slight flattening of the neck.

Characteristics
Tree cobras have proportionally larger eyes compared to Naja species, smaller fangs, and smaller bone structures. Members were formerly categorized as Naja, but anatomical analysis of midbody scale rows distinguished them as a separate taxon.

Species
Two species are recognized as valid.
Pseudohaje goldii   – Goldie's tree cobra
Pseudohaje nigra  – black tree cobra'See alsoPseudonajaReferences

Further reading
Günther A. 1858. Catalogue of the Colubrine Snakes in the Collection of the British Museum. London: Trustees of the British Museum. (Taylor and Francis, printers). xvi + 281 pp. (Pseudohaje'', new genus, p. 222).

External links

Genus: Pseudohaje at GBIF Portal

 
Snake genera
Taxa named by Albert Günther